Doctor Juan León Mallorquin is a town and district of the Alto Paraná Department, Paraguay.